Harry Oscroft (10 March 1926 – 31 December 2008) was an English footballer. A left winger, he scored over 150 goals in nearly 500 league games in a 14-year career in the English Football League.

He played for Mansfield Town for three years, before signing for Stoke City in January 1950. He made 349 appearances and scored 106 goals for the "Potters", before he was traded to Port Vale in September 1959. He left the "Valiants" in May 1961, and later turned out for non-league clubs Brantham Athletic and Sutton United.

Playing career

Mansfield Town
Oscroft began his career with Mansfield Colliery and served in the Royal Navy from the age of 17. He had trials at Notts County and Sheffield United in 1946. In 1945 he began working at a Nottingham hosiery factory, and was spotted playing football on his lunchtime break by Mansfield Town manager Roy Goodall in February 1947. The "Stags" finished eighth in the Third Division North in 1947–48, tenth in 1948–49, and eighth again in 1949–50. He scored 39 goals in 112 league games during his spell at Field Mill.

Stoke City
In January 1950, at age 23, he joined Stoke City after Bob McGrory offered Mansfield manager Freddie Steele £8,000 plus Verdi Godwin. He scored three goals in 16 First Division games in 1949–50. He hit six goals in 39 appearances in 1950–51, before hitting 10 goals in 44 games in 1951–52. McGrory was then replaced as manager by Frank Taylor. Oscroft hit ten goals in 39 games in 1952–53 to become the club's top scorer, as the "Potters" were relegated into the Second Division after finishing one point behind 20th place Manchester City. He bagged 13 goals in 36 appearances in 1953–54, before hitting 21 goals in 38 games in 1954–55 to become the club's top-scorer for a second time. He hit his first hat-trick for Stoke on 2 October 1954, in a 4–1 win over Lincoln City at Sincil Bank. Oscroft hit 18 goals in 43 games in 1955–56, becoming the club's joint-top-scorer, along with Frank Bowyer and Johnny King. City suffered a six games losing streak in which they failed to find the net late into the 1956–57 campaign, which ultimately cost them promotion; Oscroft still managed 12 goals in 42 appearances throughout the season. He was limited to 22 games and seven goals in 1957–58. He found eight goals in 30 appearances in 1958–59, as Stoke again failed to win promotion. A prolific goalscorer, averaging nearly one goal in every three games during his ten years at the Victoria Ground, he made 349 appearances and scored 106 goals, becoming the club's sixth highest goalscorer of all time (as of 2012).

Later career
In September 1959, he was traded to rivals Port Vale, along with Peter Ford, for Dickie Cunliffe and £2,000. He hit seven goals in 29 appearances in 1959–60, including four in the final day of the campaign in a 6–1 hammering of Swindon Town at Vale Park. He scored five goals in 21 Third Division games in 1960–61, and was handed a free transfer by the "Valiants" boss Norman Low in May 1961.

Style of play
Oscroft was known to often go "missing" during games, but could also provide moments of inspiration for his team. He possessed a powerful left foot shot.

Management career and later life
He retired to the Essex/Suffolk border where he became player/manager for Brantham Athletic, with whom he won the Suffolk Senior Cup in 1962. He then played a few games for Sutton United and finally retired from the game completely in 1988 and lived near Colchester.

He died in his sleep on 31 December 2008 after being cared for at home by his family; he had been suffering from Alzheimers for a number of years before he died.

Career statistics
Source:

Honours
Brantham Athletic
Suffolk Senior Cup: 1962

References

Footballers from Mansfield
English footballers
Association football wingers
Sheffield United F.C. players
Mansfield Town F.C. players
Stoke City F.C. players
Port Vale F.C. players
Brantham Athletic F.C. players
Sutton United F.C. players
English Football League players
Association football player-managers
English football managers
Deaths from dementia in England
Deaths from Alzheimer's disease
Royal Navy personnel of World War II
1926 births
2008 deaths